Alentejo Region is one of the seven NUTS 2 regions of Portugal. It covers all of the historical Alentejo Province and part of the historical Ribatejo and Estremadura provinces.

The greater region is defined within Portugal by the land bordering the left bank of the river Tagus to the North and extending to the South where it borders the Algarve region. The origin of its name, "além" + "Tejo" combined as Alentejo, literally translates to "Beyond-the-Tagus". However, a large part of the subregion Lezíria do Tejo is located on the right bank of the Tagus. The Alentejo is completely located beyond the left margin of the Tagus River.

Its main cities are Évora, Elvas, Portalegre, Beja, Moura, Serpa, Sines and Santarém.

Subdivisions

The region is subdivided into five intermunicipal communities (NUTS 3 regions):
 Alentejo Litoral
 Alentejo Central
 Alto Alentejo
 Baixo Alentejo
 Lezíria do Tejo

Demographics 

The resident population of the Alentejo stands at around 759,000 (fourth quarter, 2008 – 2 700 less than the fourth quarter of 2007), with 49% men and 51% women. It is the least populated region in the country, representing over one third of national territory but only 7.1% of its population. It is also the region with the oldest population, 22.9% being 65 years of age or more (while the national average is 17.5%).

The population is still declining – especially in the east of the Alentejo. Locals are said to migrate from the villages to the towns and from the towns to cities beyond the Alentejo. Some migration into the Alentejo is from Northern Europeans looking to escape their overcrowded regions, though not always permanently, just for sunny holiday retreats. People from China, Brazil, and mostly from (South-)Eastern Europe add to curbing population decline.

Economy 
In 2006, the region had an estimated GDP per inhabitant rating of 17,200 EUR. In 2018, the Gross domestic product (GDP) of the region was 13.1 billion euros, accounting for 6.4% of Portugal's economic output. GDP per capita adjusted for purchasing power was 21,700 euros or 72% of the EU27 average in the same year. The GDP per employee was 73% of the EU average.

Maps

References

External links

Alentejo
NUTS 2 statistical regions of the European Union
NUTS 2 statistical regions of Portugal